Róisín Elsafty (born in Connemara, Ireland) is a singer in the sean-nós tradition. She is a native speaker of Irish.

She comes from a musical family, being the daughter of Treasa Ní Cheannabháin, one of the most admired singers of the region, and having sisters, including Naisrín Elsafty, who are also performers. Her stepfather, Saber Elsafty, is Egyptian.

Musical career

Róisín made her first recording with her mother in 1996 with L'art du sean-nós for the French label Buda Musique and has appeared on several other albums.

Róisín has performed with Dónal Lunny and accordion player Máirtín O’Connor at the Konzerthaus Großer Saal, Vienna and at the ESB Ceol Festival at the National Concert Hall, Dublin.

She has also performed as part of The Irish Consort with tenor John Elwes, Reiko Ichise on bass viol and Siobhán Armstrong playing the traditional wire-strung Irish harp and the European Renaissance harp.

In 2007 she released Má bhíonn tú liom Bí liom (If you are with me, truly be with me), a CD containing both traditional and new material. This was produced by Dónal Lunny and features, among others,  accordionist Máirtín O’Connor, Ronan Browne on several instruments, and harper Siobhán Armstrong. In 2010, she won an IMA award for Best Sean Nós singer.

Róisín and her family have links with the Palestine solidarity movement in Ireland, and she has recorded a song called "An Phailistín" (Palestine) in Irish and Arabic in support of Palestinian civil rights.

Discography

Solo albums
 2007 – Má bhíonn tú liom Bí liom

Appearances/Collaborations
 2005 – Musique du monde: Irlande – L'art du Sean-Nos (with Treasa Ní Cheannabháin)

TV
 2005 – Other Voices: Songs from a Room – episode 13, as herself.

References

Links
 Róisín Elsafty's site
 Tour dates for Róisín Elsafty, free music, photographs and videos.
 

20th-century Irish women singers
21st-century Irish women singers
Irish-language singers
Irish people of Egyptian descent
Living people
Sean-nós singers
Year of birth missing (living people)